Tin Yuet may refer to:
 Tin Yuet Estate, a public housing estate in Tin Shui Wai, Hong Kong
 Tin Yuet stop, an MTR Light Rail stop adjacent to the estate